Ricardo Alonso López Encinas (born February 17, 1994, in Hermosillo, Sonora) is a professional Mexican footballer who last played for Real Zamora. He made his professional debut with Club León during a Copa MX win against Correcaminos UAT on 18 August 2015.

External links
 

Living people
1994 births
Association football defenders
Club León footballers
La Piedad footballers
Liga Premier de México players
Footballers from Sonora
Sportspeople from Hermosillo
21st-century Mexican people
Mexican footballers